The 2019–20 St. John's Red Storm women's basketball team represented St. John's University during the 2019–20 NCAA Division I women's basketball season. The Red Storm, led by sighth-year head coach Joe Tartamella, played their games at Carnesecca Arena and were members of the Big East Conference.

Roster

Schedule

|-
!colspan=9 style=| Non-conference regular season

|-
!colspan=9 style=| Big East regular season

|-
!colspan=9 style=| Big East Women's Tournament

References

St. John's
St. John's Red Storm women's basketball seasons
Saint John's
Saint John's